Cepeda de la Sierra is a municipality in the province of Salamanca, in the autonomous communities Castile and León, Spain.

Its postal code is 37656.

References

Municipalities in the Province of Salamanca